Małgorzata Braunek (30 January 1947 – 23 June 2014) was a Polish film and stage actress.

Early life
Małgorzata Braunek was born in Szamotuły. She studied acting department at National Higher School of Theatre in Warsaw until 1969, when she dropped out from to start her film career.

Personal life
She was married three times: first briefly to actor Janusz Guttner, whom she divorced in 1971; then to director Andrzej Żuławski from 1971 to 1976, with whom she had a son, Xawery; and lastly to Andrzej Krajewski until her death, with whom she had a daughter, Orina (born in 1987). She was also a long-time practitioner and teacher of Zen Buddhism receiving Dharma transmission from Dennis Merzel at Kanzeon Sangha (Warsaw) in 2003.

Death
On 23 June 2014 Braunek died from complications from ovarian cancer in Warsaw, aged 67. She was buried at Evangelical-Augsburg Cemetery, beside her mother, on 5 July 2014.

Partial filmography

 Przechodnie (1966)
 The Leap (1967) as Teresa
 Wycieczka w nieznane (1968)
 Matthew's Days (1968) as Anna
 The Game (1968)
 Shifting Sands (1968)
 Ruchome piaski (1969) as Girl
 Gra (1969)
 Hunting Flies (1969) as Irena
 Skok (1969)
 Wniebowstąpienie (1969) as Raisa
 W każdą pogodę (1969)
 Landscape After the Battle (1970) as Niemka na rowerze
 Oxygen (1970) as Patricija
 Lokis: Rękopis profesora Wittembacha (aka The Bear) (1970) as Julia Dowgiełło
 The Third Part of the Night (1971) as Marta
 The Devil (1972) as Narzeczona Jakuba / Jakuba's fiancee
 The Deluge (original title: Potop) (1974) as Billewiczówna Oleńka
 Wielki układ (1976) as Marta Nowicka
 The Shadow Line (1976)
 Lalka (1977) as Izabella Łęcka
 Jörg Ratgeb – Painter (1978) as Junge Bäurin
 Tercet egzotyczny a może erotyczny? (1978)
 Wejście w nurt (1978, TV Movie) as Malgorzata
 Dr Seneki (1980)
 The Big Night Bathe (1980) as Żana
 ...według Christiana Skrzyposzka (1996) as herself
 Darmozjad polski (1998) as a tourist
 Ktoś pamięta moje imię (1998) (voice)
 Glina (2003–2004, TV Series) as Tatiana Zubrzycka
 Tulips (2004) as Marianna
 Bulionerzy (2004–2006) as Marta Berger
 Pełną parą (2005, TV Series) as Bogusia Lamarti
 Pensjonat pod Różą (2005, TV Series) as Wiesława Pasternak
 Z milosci (2007) as Matka Rozy

Notes

External links
 
 Biography at Culture.pl
 Małgorzata Braunek at Filmweb 
 Filmography at FilmPolski.pl

Family tree

1947 births
2014 deaths
20th-century Polish actresses
21st-century Polish actresses
Burials at Evangelical-Augsburg Cemetery, Warsaw
Converts to Buddhism
Deaths from cancer in Poland
Deaths from ovarian cancer
Female Buddhist spiritual teachers
Officers of the Order of Polonia Restituta
People from Szamotuły
Polish film actresses
Polish health activists
Polish stage actresses
Polish television actresses
Polish Zen Buddhists
Recipients of the Gold Medal for Merit to Culture – Gloria Artis
Zen Buddhist spiritual teachers